Vicky Elizabeth Darling (born 29 November 1966 in Brisbane, Australia) is a Labor politician elected to the Queensland Legislative Assembly in September 2006 as the member for Sandgate.

Darling was preselected by the Labor Party in 2006 She replaced controversial Labor MP Gordon Nuttall who was jailed in July 2009 for corruptly receiving secret commissions.

She was appointed as Minister for the Environment, Resource Management and Climate Change on 22 June 2011, after Kate Jones resigned from cabinet to defend her seat of Ashgrove against Liberal National Party (LNP) leader Campbell Newman. Darling lost her seat in the LNP landslide at the 2012 state election.

Her mother, Elaine Darling, the first female member of the Australian House of Representatives from Queensland, was a Labor MP for Lilley from 1980 until 1993. Her grandfather, Jack Melloy, was a Labor Queensland state MP for
Nudgee from 1960 to 1977.

Darling is currently the CEO of Volunteering & Contact ACT.

See also
 Members of the Queensland Legislative Assembly, 2006–2009
 Members of the Queensland Legislative Assembly, 2009–2012

References

External links
Official website
Queensland Parliament's Member Biography, "Vicky Darling".
2006 State General Election Results – Sandgate.
2009 State General Election Results – Sandgate.

1966 births
Living people
Members of the Queensland Legislative Assembly
Australian Labor Party members of the Parliament of Queensland
21st-century Australian politicians
21st-century Australian women politicians
Women members of the Queensland Legislative Assembly